Academies of West Memphis (AWM), formerly West Memphis High School, is an accredited comprehensive public high school for students in grades ten through twelve in West Memphis, Arkansas, United States.  The school is administered by the West Memphis School District.

As the district's only high school, it serves sections of Crittenden and St. Francis counties, including most of West Memphis, the municipalities of Anthonyville, Edmondson, Horseshoe Lake, and Hughes, and portions of Jennette and Marion.

History 
The communities of Hughes and Horseshoe Lake, and the St. Francis County section of Jennette, all previously a part of the Hughes School District, were added to the school's service area when the Hughes district consolidated into the WMSD in 2015. High school-aged Hughes district residents were formerly served by Hughes High School, and after the Hughes closure those students were transferred to AWM.

Academics and academic performance 
The assumed course of study for West Memphis students is the Smart Core curriculum, which is the Arkansas' college and career-ready curriculum for high school students developed by the Arkansas Department of Education (ADE). Students complete regular courses and exams and Advanced Placement (AP) coursework and exams that may lead to college credit. West Memphis High School is accredited by AdvancED since 1927. The school's state accreditation with ADE is listed as 'Accredited-Cited' based on its performance since 2008–09 which has led the school to be categorized as a 'State-Directed' school for its Adequate Yearly Progress (AYP) for the No Child Left Behind Act.

Extracurricular activities 
The West Memphis High School mascot and athletic emblem is the blue devil with red and blue as its school colors.

Athletics 
The West Memphis Blue Devils compete in the 7A/6A East Conference for the following activities: football, volleyball, competitive cheer, golf (boys/girls), soccer (boys/girls), basketball (boys/girls), baseball, fastpitch softball, and track and field (boys/girls).

Basketball 
The boys basketball team has won six state (classification) championships between 1980 and 2005, including three state (overall) championships between 1980, 1981 and 1991. The 1980 and 1981 teams combined for a state-record 60 consecutive wins.

Notable alumni

 Corey Brewer—Professional basketball player
 Marcus Brown—Professional basketball player
 Michael Cage—Professional basketball player
 Gray Fenter—Professional baseball player
Wayne Jackson-Trumpet player of The Memphis Horns
 Lew Carpenter—Professional football player and coach
 Ike Harris—Professional football player
 Keith Lee—Professional basketball player and coach
 Sonny Weems—basketball player

References

External links 
 

Public high schools in Arkansas
Schools in Crittenden County, Arkansas
Buildings and structures in West Memphis, Arkansas